David Craighead (March 8, 1931 – January 19, 2016) was a Romanian-American politician. He served as a Democratic member for the 95th district of the Oklahoma House of Representatives.

Life and career 
Craighead was born in Galați in Romania. He attended Baylor University.

Craighead served in the army during the Korean conflict. He was a columnist and newspaper reporter for newspapers in Oklahoma and Texas.

In 1973, Craighead was elected to represent the 95th district of the Oklahoma House of Representatives, succeeding A. J. Clemons. He served until 1989, when he was succeeded by Jim Isaac.

Craighead died in January 2016, at the age of 84.

References 

1931 births
2016 deaths
People from Galați
Romanian emigrants to the United States
Democratic Party members of the Oklahoma House of Representatives
20th-century American politicians
20th-century Members of the Oklahoma House of Representatives
Baylor University alumni
American newspaper reporters and correspondents
American columnists
Journalists from Texas
Journalists from Oklahoma
American male journalists
United States Army personnel of the Korean War
20th-century American journalists
20th-century American male writers